The First National Bank Building is a historic bank building at 207 West Drew Avenue in the center of Monette, Arkansas.  It is a two-story Classical Revival, built of load-bearing brick and sculptured stone in 1918, and is the most architecturally significant building in the small town.  The main facade is distinguished by two large Doric columns, which frame a portico area sheltering the main entrance.  The entrance, now a modern glass doorway, is framed by a molded square arch which supports a dentillated entablature.  This assembly is itself framed by a more monumental round-arched molding with keystone.

The building was listed on the National Register of Historic Places in 2008.

See also
National Register of Historic Places listings in Craighead County, Arkansas

References

Bank buildings on the National Register of Historic Places in Arkansas
Neoclassical architecture in Arkansas
Commercial buildings completed in 1918
Buildings and structures in Craighead County, Arkansas
National Register of Historic Places in Craighead County, Arkansas